Tyrone Lewis "TyTy" Washington Jr. (born November 15, 2001) is an American professional basketball player for the Houston Rockets of the National Basketball Association (NBA). He played college basketball for the Kentucky Wildcats. He was a consensus five-star recruit and one of the top point guards in the 2021 class.

High school career
Washington played basketball for Cesar Chavez High School in Phoenix, Arizona. As a sophomore, he averaged 23.2 points, 4.1 assists, 4.4 rebounds, and 3.3 steals per game. Washington transferred to AZ Compass Prep School in Chandler, Arizona during his junior season. As a senior, he averaged 24 points, seven assists, and six rebounds per game, leading his team to a 30–2 record. He was named to the Jordan Brand Classic roster.

Recruiting
Washington was a consensus five-star recruit and one of the top point guards in the 2021 class. On November 15, 2020, he committed to playing college basketball for Creighton. He decommitted on March 11, 2021, nine days after head coach Greg McDermott recalled telling his players, "I need everybody to stay on the plantation. I can't have anybody leave the plantation," following a loss in February. On May 12, 2021, Washington committed to Kentucky over offers from Arizona, Baylor, Kansas, LSU and Oregon.

College career
On January 8, 2022, Washington recorded 17 points and 17 assists in a 92–77 win against Georgia, surpassing John Wall's single-game school record for assists. On January 15, Washington scored a career-high 28 points in a 107–79 win against Tennessee. As a freshman, Washington averaged 12.5 points, 3.9 assists, and 3.5 rebounds per game. He was named to the Second Team All-SEC as well as the All Freshman Team. On April 6, Washington declared for the 2022 NBA draft, forgoing his remaining college eligibility.

Professional career

Houston Rockets (2022–present)
Washington was selected by the Memphis Grizzlies with the 29th overall pick in the 2022 NBA draft. The Grizzlies traded Washington and Walker Kessler to the Minnesota Timberwolves on draft night for Jake LaRavia. The Timberwolves subsequently traded Washington to the Houston Rockets for Wendell Moore. On October 2, 2022, Washington made his preseason debut, scoring eight points along with three rebounds and one assist in a 134–96 win against the San Antonio Spurs.

Career statistics

College

|-
| style="text-align:left;"| 2021–22
| style="text-align:left;"| Kentucky
| 31 || 29 || 29.2 || .451 || .350 || .750 || 4.5 || 3.9 || 1.3 || .2 || 12.5

References

External links

Kentucky Wildcats bio

2001 births
Living people
American men's basketball players
Basketball players from Phoenix, Arizona
Houston Rockets players
Kentucky Wildcats men's basketball players
Memphis Grizzlies draft picks
Point guards
Rio Grande Valley Vipers players